Ken Overlin (August 15, 1910 – July 24, 1969), was an American-born middleweight boxer who fought professionally from 1931 to 1944, compiling a record of 131 wins (23 by knockout), 18 losses, and 9 draws.  He took the World middleweight championship as recognized by the New York State Athletic Commission in a win against Ceferino Garcia in New York on May 23, 1940, and held it until May 9, 1941. Overlin was inducted into the International Boxing Hall of Fame as part of the 2015 class.

Early life and career 
Overlin was born to Irish parents on August 15, 1910 in Decatur, Illinois.  He excelled in basketball and football at Decatur's Central Junior High.  While at Decatur Senior High, he worked as a bellhop, then joined the Navy in 1927, and soon began boxing, having many of his early bouts in cities where his ship the U.S.S. Tennessee was stationed. He would do most of his boxing from 1927-31 on the West coast, but his Navy and boxing career would later be based out of Norfolk, and nearby Portsmouth, Virginia.  He dropped out of the Navy in 1932, and began his boxing career under the management of Chris Dundee as a fringe middleweight contender, continuing to box around Virginia and the East Coast.

In an impressive but close win, he defeated middleweight contender and future champion Fred Apostoli in New York City's Hippodrome in a ten round mixed decision on January 27, 1937.  Apostoli began the fight as a 2-1 favorite, but was unable to stop the long thrusting lefts that Overlin sent to his face throughout the bout.  The AP score sheet gave Apostoli a slight edge, but two of the judges present at the bout gave Overlin eight of the ten rounds, giving a slight edge to Overlin in three rounds that the referee scored even.  In the first five rounds, Overlin took a slight lead showing greater speed and mobility, and displaying greater defensive skills than his older opponent.  But he was faulted by many in the crowd for his occasional holds, which he would resort to again when threatened by a highly skilled adversary.

A middleweight contender by the mid-to-late 1930s, he received his first title shot on September 11, 1937 when he was knocked out in the 4th round of a match against reigning World middleweight champion Freddie Steele in Seattle. Overlin would learn from the experience, and Steele would become the only boxer to ever defeat him by knockout.

Overlin lost to former World Middleweight champion Teddy Yarosz on March 27, 1939 in a ten round points decision in Houston, breaking an eleven match winning streak that included a single loss to Eric Seelig.

NYSAC World middleweight champ, 1940 
Overlin won recognition as a World middleweight champion by the New York State Athletic Commission on May 23, 1940, when he won a unanimous decision over Ceferino Garcia before a light crowd of 7,587 at Madison Square Garden. Overlin's fast, sweeping left hook to the body tied up Garcia's dangerous right.  The young challenger to the title took significant punishment in the fifth and sixth rounds, and in the seventh, Ceferino landed a near knockout punch to his right ear.  The former Navy boxer persevered, recovering with a left to the body and right to the head of Ceferino.  With Overlin dictating the fighting style and avoiding his opponent's deadly right, the judges credited Garcia with no more than six rounds and gave Overlin as many as ten in their scoring.

Loss of Middle title to Billy Soose 

Overlin successfully defended his title twice against Steve Belloise, before losing it to Billy Soose on May 9, 1941 in a fifteen round Unanimous Decision before 11,676 fans at New York's Madison Square Garden.  The New York Times wrote that Overlin appeared to have the upperhand in eleven of the fifteen rounds, but that Overlin probably lost points from holding at critical times in the fight to avoid blows.  A supporter of the close decision for Soose, the Dunkirk Evening Observer wrote that in the ninth Soose had Overlin nearly floored with a blow to the heart, but that Overlin wisely clinched to avoid a follow up.  The Observer also noted that in the tenth Soose shook Overlin again with a right, but by quickly countering, the reigning champion kept his opponent from a quick follow up that might have ended the match.  The crowd booed the decision once they realized Overlin had lost the title to a twenty-five year old relatively unknown, and unrated opponent.  In the close decision, one judge and one referee scored 8 rounds for Soose with seven for Overlin, though the remaining judge gave nine rounds, a slightly larger edge, to Soose.  The bout was described as somewhat dull, with frequent missed blows, no knockdowns, and both boxers leaving the ring appearing relatively unscathed and unbleeding.

Overlin continued fighting without a loss until 1945, scoring notable wins over Ezzard Charles and Al Hostak, before his retirement.  Before a crowd of 8,000, Overlin defeated former NBA Middleweight champion Al Hostak on November 21, 1941 in a ten round unanimous decision at Madison Square Garden.  Hostak threw as many as forty rights at Overlin, but nearly all whizzed past his left cheek, as Overlin dominated the last two minutes of nearly every round, taking nearly all but one round of the fight in a unanimous decision.  His win over Charles came in a ten round unanimous decision on June 9, 1941, in Cincinnati, only one month after his loss of the World middleweight title.  Charles best round was the sixth, where he tagged Overlin several times with a two handed attack.  Though there were no knockdowns in the bout, Charles was on his knees briefly in the second round.  Charles, who had not been defeated in his last 23 bouts, fought a very close match for the first six rounds, but Overlin dominated in the final four landing solid blows, particularly in rounds eight through ten as Charles became careless hoping to makeup for lost ground.

Overlin drew with Fred Apostoli on June 26, 1942 in a close ten round draw before 7,000 fans at Norfolk's Naval base. Overlin piled up points with his signature left jab, though Apostoli, with effective punching, had Overlin in a bad condition in the seventh.  Apostoli showed more aggression in the bout, tried hard for a knockout in the closing rounds, and left the ring seemingly unmarked.

Life outside boxing 
Interrupting his boxing career, Overlin rejoined the Navy in 1942 to serve during WWII, then in 1944, after completing his wartime service, he fought four additional fights. He fought his last recorded bout on September 26, 1944, against RJ Lewis in Denver, Colorado, winning in a ten round decision. He then returned to his hometown of Decatur, Illinois, where he ran a Tavern on East Main Street.  After having to sell his Main Street Tavern in 1947 by order of the Mayor due to frequent disturbances, he operated another Tavern in Springfield. He left the Springfield bar in 1955, shortly before losing his license for serving liquor to minors.  He then left Illinois, to run a bar in Vallejo, California, outside San Francisco, near the Mare Island Naval Shipyard.

After 1957, he lived in Reno, Nevada, where he worked as a bartender. He had been in ill health for the last seven years of his life as a result of an assault by a hoodlum who had pistol whipped him in May, 1962 after he had struck the man in an argument. He was required to undergo emergency surgery for skull fractures and severe scalp lacerations. Seven years after the assault, on July 24, 1969, Overlin was found dead in his Reno apartment, where he had passed a few days earlier.

Professional boxing record

References

External links
 

1910 births
1969 deaths
Middleweight boxers
World middleweight boxing champions
Irish boxers
American male boxers
Boxers from Illinois
Sportspeople from Illinois